Little Crusader is a 2017 Czech historical drama film directed by Václav Kadrnka. It won a Crystal Globe at the Karlovy Vary International Film Festival.

The film, shot in Italy, tells the story of the knight Bořek, who is travelling to find his lost son. It is based on the poem Svojanovský křižáček by Jaroslav Vrchlický.

The filming style is reminiscent of movies directed by František Vláčil.

Cast 
 Karel Roden as Bořek
 Aleš Bílík as Szimko
 Jana Semerádová as Mother
 Matouš John as Jeník
 Jiří Soukup as a Hermit
 Michal Legíň as Uhlíř
 Šimon Vyskočil as Uhlíř's son
 Jana Oľhová as the innkeeper's wife
 Ivan Krúpa as the innkeeper
 Eliška Křenková as Angel
 Jan Bednář as Štěpán
 Tomáš Bambušek as an actor

Plot
Bořek's little son Jeník hears a tale from a priest about the Children's Crusade, which influences him to run away from home. His father, who is a knight, goes on a desperate journey to find him.

Production
The film is a loose adaptation of the poem "Svojanovský křižáček". Kadrnka came across the poem while working on a different project and decided to create an adaptation of it. Preparations started in 2011 and shooting began in December 2015. The film was shot mostly in Italy, concluding in early 2016.

Reception
The film received mixed reactions from critics and audiences, many of whom debated whether it really deserved the Crystal Globe.

Accolades

References

External links
 
 

2010s historical drama films
2017 films
Crystal Globe winners
Czech historical drama films
2010s Czech-language films
Films shot in Italy
Czech Lion Awards winners (films)